Aero K Airlines Co., Ltd. is a low cost airline based in South Korea. It was founded in 2017 and received its first aircraft in 2021. The name is derived from spelling "Korea" backwards.

History 
Aero K was founded in 2017 originally named as K-AIR Aviation. They obtained their AOC (Air Operator's Certificate) on 28 December 2020. The company received their first Airbus A320 registered as HL8384 on 14 February 2021. The airline also expects to receive another 2 Airbus A320s.

Aero K aims to start flights to destinations within Asia to China, Japan, Taiwan and Vietnam. Their inaugural flight was a domestic flight within South Korea to Jeju International Airport from their hub in Cheongju.

Destinations

Fleet

See also
 List of airlines of South Korea
 Low-cost carrier

References

External links
 

Airlines of South Korea
2017 establishments in South Korea